General Revenue Corporation is a United States debt-recovery organization that specializes in the recovery of defaulted student loans and consumer loans.  GRC is a subsidiary of SLM.

References

Collection agencies